The Český Fousek is a Czech breed of versatile hunting dog that was traditionally and currently used to hunt, point, and retrieve. This refers to the dog's natural ability in tracking, pointing, and retrieving game. The name is in Czech, in which český means Czech and fousek is derived from vousy (facial hair) or vousky (whiskers). While the name is used for both sexes, Český Fousek specifically refers to a male dog while the female is traditionally called Česká Fouska. The breed is part of the griffon hunting dog family and have the beard and moustache ("facial furnishings") common to wirehairs.

Description

Appearance 
A medium-sized breed with a coarse coat, the Český Fousek is an athletically built dog with a wiry, muscular body. Their most noticeable trait is their distinguishing facial fur. Their soft, bushy eyebrows, mustache, and beard are what make them so recognizable. Their velvety ears hang loosely to the side of their face, while their endearing almond-shaped eyes are deep-set, and can be amber or brown color.

Size
Mid-sized dog. Height for males , for females . Weight for males , for females .

Temperament
This breed is a hunting dog able to adapt to any sort of terrain and type of hunting. Can be used for pointing and retrieving upland game and waterfowl retrieval. Where allowed by law, can be used for tracking large game or finding wounded and down big game. Fantastic family dog as well as an excellent hunting dog.

History
The Český Fousek is a much newer wirehaired versatile hunting dog in relation to many other European or Continental breeds, with written standards first established in the nineteenth century and FCI recognition in 1964.  The breed nearly became extinct in the 1920s, and was saved by dedicated breeders in Czech Republic by breeding with other versatile hunting breeds, such as the German Shorthaired Pointer and German Wirehaired Pointer. This caused problems for acceptance of the breed by the FCI as the German Kennel Club (Verband für das Deutsche Hundewesen) opposed it based on being nearly genetic identical to the Stichelhaar.  Separately, this happened again in the US in the 1980s and 1990s with infusion of the Český Fousek into the Wirehaired Pointing Griffon, causing a split among members and the forming of two new and separate clubs, the Cesky Fousek North America (formerly Bohemian Wirehaired Pointing Griffon Club of America) and the American Wirehaired Pointing Griffon Association.

The Český Fousek was used in the creation of the foundation stock of the Slovak Rough-haired Pointer.

See also
 Dogs portal
 List of dog breeds

References

External links

Website of Klub Chovatelů Českých Fousků, the main breeding organization of the breed
Cesky Fousek North America (formerly "Bohemian Wirehaired Pointing Griffon Club of America") is the U.S. breed club.
Cesky Fousek Smugmug Gallery  An extensive photo gallery of the Cesky Fousek maintained by the U.S. breed club.
Tracing genetic resurrection of pointing dog breeds: Cesky Fousek as both survivor and rescuer 
Breed Profile: Cesky Fousek
 

FCI breeds
Dog breeds originating in the Czech Republic
Gundogs
Pointers